Heritiera longipetiolata (Chamorro: Ufa-hålomtåno) is a species of flowering plant in the family Malvaceae. It is found in Guam, Northern Mariana Islands, and possibly Micronesia. It is threatened by habitat loss.

References

longipetiolata
Vulnerable plants
Flora of the Northwestern Pacific
Taxonomy articles created by Polbot